Dewey Balfa (March 20, 1927 – June 17, 1992) was an American Cajun fiddler and singer who contributed significantly to the popularity of Cajun music. Balfa was born near Mamou, Louisiana. He is perhaps best known for his 1964 performance at the Newport Folk Festival with Gladius Thibodeaux and Vinus LeJeune, where the group received an enthusiastic response from over seventeen thousand audience members.  He sang the song "Parlez Nous à Boire" in the 1981 cult film Southern Comfort, in which he had a small role.

Early life
Dewey Balfa was born in Grand Louis, Louisiana, a small community west of Mamou.  He was the son of Amay (née Ardoin) and Charles Balfa who were sharecroppers.  Balfa had learned most of his songs from his grandmother and father who was a fiddle player.

Musical career
During World War II, Balfa worked in a shipyard in Orange, Texas.  After returning in 1948, he and his brothers Will and Rodney formed the Musical Brothers.  In 1965, he formed The Balfa Brothers after an enthusiastic response from a performance at the Newport Folk Festival.  This led to their first LP, produced by Swallow Records.

Family
Balfa married Hilda Frugé when he was 22 in 1949.  They had five children together:  Nelda, Roberta, Norma, Dewey Jr., and Christine, many of whom became musicians.  Christine founded the band Balfa Toujours to continue the family tradition.

Popularization of Cajun music
Balfa appears in a documentary film entitled Les Blues de Balfa produced by Yasha Aginsky. In one scene, Balfa is shown with Nathan Abshire entertaining a group of school children. Balfa gives a short lecture concerning the origins of Cajun music:

Musical samples
 J'ai Passé devant ta Porte Listen
 Jolie Blonde Listen

Selected discography
 1976: Traditional Cajun Fiddle: Instruction (Smithsonian Folkways)
 1977: Cajun Fiddle, Old and New: Instruction (Smithsonian Folkways)
 1984: Les Quatre Vieux Garçons (Smithsonian Folkways)
 1986: Dewey Balfa and Friends Fait A La Main! (Handmade Records) 
 1986: Spicy Traditional Instrumental Cajun Classics!  (Swallow Records LP-6063)
 1993: Folk Masters: Great Performances Recorded Live at the Barns of Wolf Trap (Smithsonian Folkways)
 2012: The Balfa Family: A Retrospective - Festivals Acadiens et Créoles 1977-2010 (2012, Valcour Records)

Selected filmography
 1972: Spend It All by Les Blank
 1974: Dedans le sud de la Louisiane by Jean-Pierre Bruneau
 1983: Les Blues de Balfa by Yasha Aginsky

Awards and honors
Balfa was a recipient of a 1982 National Heritage Fellowship awarded by the National Endowment for the Arts, which is the United States government's highest honor in the folk and traditional arts. That year's fellowships were the first bestowed by the NEA.

See also
The Balfa Brothers
List of Cajun musicians
History of Cajun music

References

External links
Biography, Balfa Toujours website
VH1.com profile
Balfa Discography at Smithsonian Folkways
Documentary film about Balfa and Cajun music
NPR:Commerce

National Heritage Fellowship winners
1927 births
1992 deaths
People from Evangeline Parish, Louisiana
Cajun fiddlers
20th-century American violinists